Go! Go! Cosmo Cops! is a 2009 platform video game developed by Noise and published by Namco Bandai Games for the Nintendo DS in Europe.

Notes

References 

2009 video games
Bandai Namco games
Europe-exclusive video games
Nintendo DS games
Noise (company) games
Nintendo DS-only games
Platform games
Video games about police officers
Video games developed in Japan